This list of style guide abbreviations provides the meanings of the abbreviations that are commonly used as short ways to refer to major style guides. They are used especially by editors communicating with other editors in manuscript queries, proof queries, marginalia, emails, message boards, and so on.

Style guide